Bateman is an unincorporated community located in the town of Lafayette, Chippewa County, Wisconsin, United States. The community was named for Mathew P. Bateman, the site's owner, who emigrated from Ireland in the early 1850s. His son, Alicon, was the first postmaster in 1883.

Notes

Unincorporated communities in Chippewa County, Wisconsin
Unincorporated communities in Wisconsin